Bee Hives is a 2004 album by Canadian indie rock group Broken Social Scene. It is a collection of B-sides from their second full-length, You Forgot It in People.

The working title for the album was Death Is a B-Side. Cover art for this title can be found in the book This Book Is Broken.

Track listing
 "(untitled - intro)"  – 0:37
 "Market Fresh"  – 3:57
 "Weddings"  – 7:02
 "hHallmark"1  – 3:53
 "Backyards"  – 8:14
 "Da Da Da Da"  – 7:09
 "Ambulance for the Ambience"  – 5:18
 "Time = Cause"  – 5:07
 "Lover's Spit"2  – 7:34

Notes
1 The song title "hHallmark" is not a typographical error. The extra "h" is an allusion to Brendan Canning's prior band, hHead.

2 Feist contributed vocals to the single "Lover's Spit" as a B-side.

References

Broken Social Scene albums
B-side compilation albums
2004 compilation albums
Arts & Crafts (record label) compilation albums